Gaur is a municipality and headquarters of Rautahat district of Narayani zone, Nepal. It lies at the border of Nepal that links India via Bairgania and has a customs checkpoint.

The former Prime Minister of Nepal Madhav Kumar Nepal is a resident.

Climate

The Gaur has a humid, tropical climate. More than 80% of the total annual rainfall occurs during the monsoon season from June to September.

In the past, the inner and outer Terai were a formidable barrier between Nepal and potential invaders from India because marshes and forests were infested by anopheline mosquitos that transmitted virulent strains of malaria, especially during the hot spring and rainy summer monsoon.

There are several differences between the climate on the eastern edge of the Terai at Biratnagar in Nepal and on the western edge of the Terai at Nepaljung in Nepal to that of Gaur in Nepal although they lies in same plain of Terai.

 Moving inland and away from monsoon sources in the Bay of Bengal, the climate becomes more continental with a greater difference between summer and winter.
 In the far western Terai, which is five degrees latitude further north, the coldest months' average is  cooler.
 Total rainfall markedly diminishes from east to west. The monsoon arrives later, is much less intense and ends sooner. However, winters are wetter in the west.au in Nepal near the central edge although both lies in Terai.
 Moving inland and away from monsoon sources in the Bay of Bengal, the climate becomes more continental with a greater difference between summer and winter.
 In the far western Terai, which is five degrees latitude further north, the coldest months' average is  cooler.
 Total rainfall markedly diminishes from east to west. The monsoon arrives later, is much less intense and ends sooner. However, winters are wetter in the west.

Education

Shree Juddha Campus
The origin of this campus goes back to its former "Shree Juddha Higher Secondary School" and further "Shree Juddha Secondary School", the third-oldest school in Nepal inaugurated by Juddha Shamsher Jang Bahadur Rana during Rana dynasty. The school got its name from his name. The institution has about 1500 students.

Shree Juddha Campus offers bachelor courses like Bachelor of Education, Bachelor of Arts, Bachelor of Commerce, and other Bachelor courses etc. while its former entities "Shree Juddha Higher Secondary School" offers 10+2 courses of National Examinations Board and "Shree Juddha Secondary School" offers up to 10th class of School Leaving Certificate (Nepal).

Transport

Gaur-Chandranigahpur Highway, Birendra Highway, starts there and joins to East-West Highway in Chandrapur which connects Gaur to all major cities of Nepal.

The transport facility is reliable. There are more than 35 buses directly for capital of Nepal, Kathmandu, including 5 Volvo. One can also get direct bus for other major cities like Birgunj, Janakpurdham, Pokhara, Biratnagar, Nepalgunj, Bharatpur, and other city etc.

The nearest domestic airport, Simara Airport, is in Simra while nearest International airport, Nijgadh International Airport is under construction in Nijgadh. Currently passengers use Tribhuvan International Airport located in capital of Nepal, Kathmandu, for International flight. The nearest Indian domestic airport is Jai Prakash Narayan airport at Patna, which is about 177 km from Gaur.

As it is a border of Nepal that links India via Bairgania, one can reach to all major cities of India using Indian Railways available at Bairgania. Bairgania railway station is about 3 km from Gaur and several local transport like Tanga, Rickshaw, etc. are available from here.

Communication
Nepal Telecom and Ncell have network coverage. Ncell has a 4G network for a long time there but now Nepal Telecom has now 4G network. Other cellular network available are UTL Nepal, Smart Cell. Indian network providers such as BSNL and MTS's network is available too. ISPs like Worldlink, UTL Nepal and Nepal Telecom is available. Subisu is the largest ISPs in Rautahat district.

Border sharing with India
Gaur has its importance because of its border sharing with Bairgania, India also. No documents are required to cross the border. Certain restrictions are enforced on many edible and electronics products and they are properly checked before allowing them to cross.

There is a custom office which keeps a check on the vehicles entering Gaur having Indian vehicle registration number. Certain taxes are imposed by the office on heavy products/items entering Nepal.

References

Populated places in Rautahat District
Transit and customs posts along the India–Nepal border
Populated places in Mithila, Nepal
Nepal municipalities established in 1992
Municipalities in Madhesh Province